Beoncy Laishram (born, Boboi Laishram) is the first North East Indian trans woman doctor. As of 2021, she is the only transgender doctor from Manipur state. Trans women in Manipur see her as a symbol of hope. In Manipur, there is a lot of discrimination against trans women. Beoncy is a post-operative trans woman. She had sex reassignment surgery in Puducherry.

Beoncy is a Resident Medical Officer (RMO) at the Shija Hospitals and Research Institute in Imphal.

Early life and career 
Beoncy Laishram is the youngest of the three siblings. Her father was a bus driver. When Laishram was in Class 8 at Human Resource Development (HRD) School in Imphal, she began to understand that she was trans and not cisgender. She did not tell anyone she had a female gender identity until she was in her third year of MBBS. Instead, she lived as a man. In 2013, when her family learned about her real gender identity, they were upset. Her father tried to kill himself. In the same year, she changed her name from the masculine "Boboi" to feminine "Beoncy". She did this so she could be in the beauty contest "Miss Trans Queen North East" in 2013.

Laishram said:
"Friends were abusive, they taunted at me wherever I went. I withdrew into my closet to avoid the mental torture. It was a continuous struggle to establish my identity and make people accept it."

She started taking classes at MBBS in 2011 and finished in 2015. In 2016, she realised that she could not live as a man any longer. She openly told people she was a transgender woman.

After working for some time in the Babu Jagjivanram Memorial Hospital in New Delhi, she worked in the North Eastern Indira Gandhi Regional Institute of Health and Medical Sciences (NEIGRIHMS) in Shillong as a junior resident doctor for one year. Later, she joined at the Shija Hospital and Research Center in Imphal as a Resident Medical Officer (RMO).

She was the first transgender doctor from North East India. She said:
"I look like a woman now. So, no one realise I am a trans person until they hear my voice. Some people are startled, but that is it. I have been working here since November 2019."

Being a former student in the Regional Institute of Medical Sciences (RIMS), Imphal, she always helps disadvantaged transgender people to find proper health care.

She is taking a post-graduate program in plastic surgery. She is also fighting the COVID-19 pandemic as a doctor.

See also 
 Bishesh Huirem
 Robert Naorem
 Santa Khurai

References 

Meitei people
Indian activists
Living people
Transgender women
Year of birth missing (living people)